Hindustan Antibiotics School (also known as H.A. School) is a secondary school in India. It was formed in 1958 in Pimpri-Chinchwad, Pune, India.

Admission

Admission to H.A. School is based on first-come, first-served basis. Pimpri-area applicants submit their duly filled admission applications for their child or ward in Accounts department by the due date. Shortlisted applicants and their parents are invited for a brief personal interview. Post selection, child or ward begins attending school when the new academic year begins in June. Mid-academic year admissions are accepted on exception basis and may be discussed directly with the Principal or Supervisor of the respective unit (Pre-Primary, Primary or Secondary).

History
Hindustan Antibiotics School, also known as HA School was formed in 1958. The first building was inaugurated by Lal Bahadur Shastri and the second one by the honourable prime minister of India, Pandit Jawaharlal Nehru. Having a rich history of over 50 years and managed by the prestigious Deccan Education Society, the school is affiliated to Maharashtra State Board of Secondary and Higher Secondary Education and is government aided. It boasts of all the things a school should have - large classrooms, a big playground, access to a well-stocked library and most of all, experienced teachers. The present Principal of Primary unit is Mrs. Kalpana Agawane and Secondary unit is Mr. Eknath Burse.

It is co-educational and inclusive school with 2 mediums of instruction - English and Marathi. It operates from Nursery to Std. X. In the 2016 academic year, there were over 1200 students in Primary Unit and over 2000 in Secondary Unit.

Alumni
Since its inception, the Hindustan Antibiotics School has been the alma-mater for thousands of successful students who have now made a name for themselves in various fields around the world. Many of these students have a strong connection with their school and contribute in some way to the school's progress individually and through the school's Alumni Association. The registration of the Hindustan Antibiotics School Alumni Association, abbreviated as HASAA, was completed in March 2012 with the registration number as MAH 348/2012/Pune. HASAA is the official alumni association of HA School recognised and endorsed by the school and the D. E. Society.

HASAA aims to reach out to the extensive alumni network that Hindustan Antibiotics School has formed over the years and create a common platform for them to contribute and gain from this association.

References

External links

High schools and secondary schools in Maharashtra
Schools in Pune
Education in Pimpri-Chinchwad
Educational institutions established in 1958
1958 establishments in Bombay State